Sandama is a village and seat (chef-lieu) of the  rural commune of Sobra in the Kati Cercle of the Koulikoro Region of Mali.

References 

Populated places in Koulikoro Region